Scrobipalpa arborealis is a moth in the family Gelechiidae. It was described by Povolný in 1978. It is found in Mongolia.

References

Scrobipalpa
Moths described in 1978